A patrol is the reconnaissance of or providing security for a designated area or route.

Patrol, Patroller or Patrolling may also refer to:

Arts and entertainment
 Patrol (novel), a 1927 novel by Philip MacDonald
 Patrol (TV series), a 1989 Singaporean drama series
 The Patrol, a 2013 British film
 Patrol, a board wargame later incorporated into Sniper!

Places
 Patrol, a village in Cianjur Regency, West Java, Indonesia
 Patrol, a district in Indramayu Regency, West Java, Indonesia
 Patrol Baru, a village in Sukra district, Indramayu Regency, West Java, Indonesia

Police and military
 Patrol officer, a police officer responsible for a particular 'beat' or area
 Patrol Special police, a neighborhood police force in San Francisco, California
 Patrolling, a military tactic

Transportation

Motor vehicles
 Nissan Patrol, a four-wheel-drive vehicle
 Roadside assistance or "roadside patrol", vehicle–breakdown assistance services, including those provided by:
 American Automobile Association, US
 The Automobile Association, UK
 RAC Limited, UK
 Patrol, a type of wildland fire engine

Ships
 HMS Patrol, a British Royal Navy scout cruiser 1905–1919
 HMS Patroller (D07), a World War II aircraft carrier
 USCGC Patrol, two US Coast Guard or Revenue Cutter Service vessels
 USS Patrol, several US Navy ships

Other uses
 Junior safety patrol, volunteer student crossing guards for American schools
 Scout patrol, a subdivision of a Scout Troop
 Patrol Software, a company acquired by BMC Software